No Entry is an 2005 Indian Hindi-language comedy film written and directed by Anees Bazmee and produced by Boney Kapoor. The film stars Salman Khan, Anil Kapoor, Fardeen Khan, Bipasha Basu, Lara Dutta, Esha Deol and Celina Jaitly with Sameera Reddy in a cameo appearance. The soundtrack of the film is composed by Anu Malik. It is an official remake of the Tamil film Charlie Chaplin (2002)

It received mixed-to-positive reviews from critics, with praise for its humor, soundtrack and performances of the cast; however its story and screenplay received criticism.

At the 51st Filmfare Awards, No Entry received 4 nominations, including Best Film, Best Performance in a Comic Role Anil Kapoor and Best Supporting Actress (Basu).

On 27 December 2021, Salman Khan confirmed that its spiritual sequel No Entry Mein Entry is in the works.

Plot
Kishan, a wealthy print-media owner is married to the suspicious-minded Kajal, who thinks he is having an affair with another woman, though he is faithful to her and never wills to betray her anyway. His friend Prem, a rich businessman has the opposite situation has many affairs with other girls, even though he is married to Pooja, who is very trusting. Kishan's employee, Shekhar, accidentally falls in love with Sanjana, who hates lies and doesn't tolerate other women in a man's life.

As Kishan takes Prem's photos with his girlfriend and threatens to inform Pooja, Prem sends Bobby, a call girl to seduce Kishan. The plan is that he'll fall into Prem's trap. Kishan plans to meet Bobby at his home while Kajal travels to Ajmer. As her passport is left at home, she returns and finds Bobby with Kishan in their outhouse, which they'd given Shekhar to live in. Kishan tells her that Bobby is Shekhar's wife; Sanjana, set to marry Shekhar, thinks Bobby is Kishan's wife.

Prem, in order to save his friends' marriages, tells Sanjana and Kajal that Bobby was his first wife. It becomes a bundle of confusion, arguments and comedy when all the various couples meet together. The truth is eventually told through many comedic encounters, and eventually Kishan, Prem and Shekhar seemingly turn over a new leaf. It is hinted at the film end, however, that the three friends haven't fully turned over a new leaf with the entrance of Sameera Reddy in a cameo.

Cast
Salman Khan as Prem Khanna
Anil Kapoor as Kishan Singhania
Fardeen Khan as Shekhar "Sunny" Gupta 
Bipasha Basu as Bobby
Lara Dutta as Kajal Singhania
Esha Deol as Pooja Khanna
Celina Jaitly as Sanjana Saxena
Boman Irani as Param Kumar Gupta/PK
Neetha Shetty as Preeti
Paresh Ganatra as Jagmohan Kaushik
Dinesh Hingoo as Dr Dilip Jaisingh/Hotel employee
Pratima Kazmi as Dhamini Gupta
Razak Khan as Johnny Toteywala
Anjan Srivastav as Judge Mrityunjay Saxena
Sameera Reddy as Nisha/Beach Girl (cameo appearance)

Production

Development
During the production of No Entry, speculations arose that it would be a remake of the film Masti (2004). The comparisons were made due to both films revolving around the same subject of extra-marital affairs. However, producer Boney Kapoor strongly denied the similarities and clarified that No Entry would be a remake of the Tamil movie titled Charlie Chaplin (2002). Kapoor also stressed that he would never endorse innuendo-based films such as Masti.

Reception

Box office
It was a box office success, grossing 74.13 crore worldwide. The film topped the Chennai box office on its opening weekend.

Critical response 
Taran Adarsh of Bollywood Hungama gave the film 3.5 stars out of 5, and stated "No Entry is a joyride that is bound to click with the masses in a big way. At the box-office, No Entry has all it takes to prove a success story on account of its massive star cast and excellent comedy it has to offer. Go have fun!" India Today stated, "The movie is mostly about suspicious, nagging wives, extramarital affairs and lots of semi-clad, sexy bodies cavorting in foreign locations." Patsy N of Rediff.com stated, "If we can watch men sleeping around, and laugh about them, why can't we do the same with movies about woman having extramarital affairs?"

Jaspreet Pandohar of BBC gave the film 2 out of 5 stars and stated "After tackling a romance and thriller, writer/director Anees Bazmee tries his hand at comedy with No Entry, a caper jammed-packed with Bollywood stars. Great gags sadly deteriorate into a series of stinky slapstick scenes you'll wish had never entered your life." Marc Savlov of Austin Chronicle gave the film 3.5 out of 5 stars, and stated "Writer-turned-director Bazmee has crafted a relatively smart and snarky war of the sexes minus the sex but with plenty of juicily hammy performances and enough outrageous one-liners, sight gags, and mistaken-identity yuks." Ekanshu Khera of Planet Bollywood gave the film 3.5 stars out of 5, and stated "Well-etched characters, hysterical situations, showcase of stars, witty dialogues, striking cinematography and scenic locales are some of the moments that stand out."

Soundtrack
The music of the film was composed by Anu Malik. Lyrics were written by Sameer. 'Kahan Ho Tum' is the last song sung by Kumar Sanu and Udit Narayan together.

Track listing

.

Sequel

Since 2008, a sequel of No Entry is in reports. Bazmee confirmed the sequel in August 2020 stating that Anil Kapoor, Salman Khan and Fardeen Khan will return and play triple roles this time. 10 actresses will be signed for the sequel, with high VFX to be used. Salman also confirmed in December 2021 that he will soon begin work on the film. The sequel, No Entry Mein Entry will be produced by Boney Kapoor, Panorama Studios, Salman Khan, T-Series and Murad Khetani and is expected to release on Diwali /Christmas Day/ 29 Dec 2023 or Republic Day 2024. The filming is supposed to start in December 2022 or January 2023.

See also
List of highest-grossing Bollywood films

References

External links

2005 films
2000s Hindi-language films
Hindi remakes of Tamil films
Films scored by Anu Malik
Indian comedy films
Films directed by Anees Bazmee
2005 comedy films
Hindi-language comedy films